Rob Ricci (born December 12, 1984) is a Canadian professional ice hockey forward who is currently an unrestricted free agent. He most recently played for the South Carolina Stingrays of the ECHL.

Playing career
Ricci started his junior career with the Georgetown Raiders of the Ontario Provincial A Junior Hockey League, playing one game in the 2001–02 season with no points or penalty minutes. For the 2002–03 season, Ricci moved to the Milton Merchants (also of the OPJHL), where he put up an impressive 76 points in combined goals and assists and 10 penalty minutes over 49 games.

Ricci skated with the Cedar Rapids RoughRiders of the United States Hockey League from 2003 to 2005, earning 99 points in regular season play and 8 points in the post-season.  Ricci finished the 2004–05 season with a plus/minus of +20.  The RoughRiders would win both the regular season points championship (Anderson Cup) and the post-season Clark Cup that year.

From 2005 to 2009, Ricci attended Merrimack College, where he played all but his sophomore year due to an "unspecified violation of team rules and school policy." Ricci led the Warriors in scoring during his freshman year, and in points (34), assists (21), and power play goals (6) his junior season.  He served as assistant captain his junior year and was named a co-captain for his senior season. Ricci was named team MVP for all three seasons he played at Merrimack.

At the end of the 2008–09 season, Ricci signed with the Las Vegas Wranglers of the ECHL and launched his pro career.  He played 4 regular season games with the Wranglers in which he earned 2 assists and 4 penalty minutes.  Ricci moved to the South Carolina Stingrays for the post-season, scoring one goal in what would become a league-record third successful run for the Kelly Cup.

Ricci returned to the Stingrays for the 2009–10 season, earning 50 points in combined goals (25) and assists (25) in regular season play, as well as scoring one goal in the Stingrays' first-round playoff elimination. Ricci earned his first professional hat trick against the Cincinnati Cyclones in March of that year.

Ricci re-signed with the Stingrays for the 2010–11 season. Ricci tallied his second professional hat trick against the Gwinnett Gladiators in a 4–1 victory in January 2011.

In July 2011, Ricci signed with the Odense Bulldogs of Denmark's AL-Bank Ligaen.  He had a successful season with the team, scoring 44 points in 37 regular season games and 19 points in 15 playoff games, as Odense finished as runners-up of the 2011–12 season.  His efforts earned him a spot on the Danish League All Star Team and in March of that season he was named the league's player of the month.  For the 2012–13 season, Ricci began the season playing with Mora IK in Allsvenskan, the Tier 2 league in Sweden. However, after playing 8 games with the team and 2 games with its J20 squad, Ricci returned to Denmark and spent the rest of the season with the Herning Blue Fox where he chipped in 15 goals and 25 assist, for 40 points, in 28 games.  For the 2013–14 season, Ricci completed another tour with the Bulldogs, contributing 28 points in 40 games.  The 2014–15 season will bring Ricci to Glasgow, Scotland, on a one-year contract with the Dundee Stars of the EIHL. After 15 games, Ricci felt uneasy about continuing and left Dundee. Once the ECHL's Brampton Beast invited him, the prospect of being a part of his hometown team, "playing at home in front of my family and my friends was something that I thought I’d enjoyed.” After a struggling beginning, with just 4 goals in 24 games, Ricci was considering retirement. Once the Stingrays, now coached by a former teammate of Ricci's, Spencer Carbery, offered to bring Ricci to their squad, Ricci felt he should give a chance to his first professional team and an old friend. The Stingrays traded defensemen Guy Leboeuf for Ricci, who helped the team reach a record winning streak of 18 games.

Personal life
Ricci is married since 2013 to Danielle.

Career statistics

Awards and honors

References

External links
Rob Ricci's career stats at The Internet Hockey Database
Rob Ricci at stingrayshockey.com
Rob Ricci's USHL stats at pointstreak.com

1984 births
Brampton Beast players
Canadian ice hockey forwards
Cedar Rapids RoughRiders players
Dundee Stars players
Herning Blue Fox players
Ice hockey people from Ontario
Las Vegas Wranglers players
Living people
Merrimack Warriors men's ice hockey players
Mora IK players
Odense Bulldogs players
Sportspeople from Brampton
Peoria Rivermen (AHL) players
South Carolina Stingrays players
Canadian expatriate ice hockey players in Scotland
Canadian expatriate ice hockey players in Denmark
Canadian expatriate ice hockey players in Sweden
Canadian expatriate ice hockey players in the United States